John Redman may refer to:

John Redman (physician) (1722–1808), first president of the Philadelphia College of Physicians
John Redman (Trinity College) (1499–1551), first Master of Trinity College, Cambridge
John R. Redman (1898–1970), United States naval officer
John Redman (sport wrestler), American Olympic wrestler

See also
John Reedman (1865–1924), Australian sportsman